The 33rd Iowa Infantry Regiment was an infantry regiment that served in the Union Army during the American Civil War.

Service
The 33rd Iowa Infantry was organized at Oskaloosa, Iowa and mustered in for three years of Federal service  on October 4, 1862.

The regiment was mustered out on August 15, 1865.

Total strength and casualties
A total of  1242 men served in the 33rd Iowa at one time or another during its existence.
It suffered 3 officers and 65 enlisted men who were killed in action or who died of their wounds and 1 officer and 215 enlisted men who died of disease, for a total of 284 fatalities.

Commanders
 Colonel Samuel A. Rice
 Lieutenant Colonel Cyrus H. Mackey

See also
List of Iowa Civil War Units
Iowa in the American Civil War

Notes

References
The Civil War Archive

Units and formations of the Union Army from Iowa
Military units and formations established in 1862
1862 establishments in Iowa
Military units and formations disestablished in 1865